Allardyce is both a surname and a given name. Notable people with the name include:

Surname
Alexander Allardyce (1846–1896), Scottish author
Craig Allardyce (born 1975), English football manager and former player and agent, son of Sam Allardyce
Paula Allardyce, a pseudonym of Ursula Torday (1912–1997), novelist
Sam Allardyce (born 1954), English football manager and retired player, father of Craig Allardyce
William Allardyce (1861–1930), British civil servant, governor of several former colonies

Given name
Allardyce Mallon (born 1965), Scottish composer, conductor, repetiteur and pianist
Allardyce Nicoll (1894–1976), English literary scholar and teacher

Allardyce is one of 44 variant spellings and is part of the Allardice Castle legacy in NE Scotland.
(See www.allerdice.net)

See also
Allardyce Range, mountain range in South Georgia, an island in the South Atlantic
Rosita Harbour, a.k.a. Allardyce Harbour, also in South Georgia
Allardice (disambiguation)
Alexander Allardyce